The 2012–13 season was Sunray Cave JC Sun Hei's 12th season in the Hong Kong First Division League. They started as the defending champions having won the Senior Challenge Shield last season. As the champions of 2011–12 Hong Kong Senior Challenge Shield, they competed in the 2013 AFC Cup. They also competed in the Hong Kong First Division League and the FA Cup.

Key Events
 25 May 2012: Midfielder Michael Luk and defender Jack Sealy join South China for an undisclosed fee.
 16 July 2012: Sunray Cave JC Sun Hei were back in training after season break. 12 new players have joined the team, including Cheung Kin Fung, Cheung Chi Yung, Chow Kwok Wai, Zhang Chunhui, Yuen Tsun Nam.
 23 October 2012: Due to the poor result in the beginning of the season, Tim Bredbury's contract was terminated by the club.
 11 December 2012: South African forward Makhosonke Bhengu is released by the club due to discipline reason.
 7 January 2013: Hong Kong international left back Cheung Kin Fung leaves the club and signs a 6-month contract with Kitchee. At the same time, James Ha and Liang Zicheng are loaned from Kitchee until the end of the season.
 31 January 2013: Cameroonian forward Yrel Cedrique Arnaud Bouet joins the club for an undisclosed fee.
 31 January 2013: Hong Kong midfielder Yeung Chi Lun joins the club from Biu Chun Rangers for an undisclosed fee.

Players

First team
As of 31 January 2013.

Remarks:
NP These players are registered as foreign players.

Players with dual nationality:
  Su Yang (Local player)
  Zhang Chunhui (Local player, eligible to play for Hong Kong national football team)
  Liang Zicheng (Local player, eligible to play for Hong Kong national football team)
  Leung Ka Hai (Local player, eligible to play for Hong Kong national football team)
  James Ha (Local player, eligible to play for Hong Kong national football team)

Transfers

In

Out

Loan In

Loan Out

Stats

Squad Stats

Top scorers
As of 4 May 2013

Disciplinary record
As of 4 May 2013

Competitions

Overall

First Division League

Classification

Results summary

Results by round

Matches

Pre-season

Competitive

First Division League

Remarks: 
1 The capacity of Aberdeen Sports Ground is originally 9,000, but only the 4,000-seated main stand is opened for football match.
2 Home match against Yokohama FC Hong Kong was originally scheduled to be played on 2 March 2013 but was postponed and rescheduled to be played on 23 March 2013.
3 Away match against Kitchee was originally scheduled to be played on 31 March 2013 but was rescheduled to be played on 29 March 2013.

Senior Challenge Shield

Quarterfinals

FA Cup

Quarter-finals

AFC Cup

Group stage

Remarks:
1The match was abandoned after 65 minutes of play as Persibo Bojonegoro failed to reach the required limit of players on pitch. Sunray Cave JC Sun Hei were leading 8–0. The result was declared final by AFC.

Notes

References

Sun Hei SC seasons
Sun